Afigya Kwabre North District is one of the forty-three districts in Ashanti Region, Ghana. Originally it was formerly part of the then-larger Afigya-Kwabre District on 29 February 2008, until the northern part of the district was split off to create Afigya Kwabre North District on 15 March 2018; thus the remaining part has been renamed as Afigya Kwabre South District. The district assembly is located in the northern part of Ashanti Region and has Boamang as its capital town.

Sources
 
 GhanaDistricts.com

References

Districts of Ashanti Region